Dani Gal is an artist and a filmmaker, born 1975 in Jerusalem, lives and works in Berlin, Germany.

Biography

He studied at Bezalel Academy for Art and Design in Jerusalem, Staatliche Hochschule für Bildende Künste Städelschule in Frankfurt and in Cooper Union in New York. His films and installations have been shown at the 54th Venice Biennale (2011), Istanbul Biennale (2011), New Museum New York (2012), Kunsthalle St. Gallen Switzerland (2013), The Jewish Museum New York (2014), Berlinale Forum Expanded (2014), Kunsthaus Zurich (2015) Kunsthalle Wien (2015), Documenta 14 (2017), Centre Pompidou (2018), Club TransMediale Festival Berlin, Festival Steirischer Herbst, Graz (2020). In 2019 he was artist-in-residence with Blood Mountain Projects and research fellows at the Vienna Wiesenthal Institute.

Selected exhibitions 
 2020 – Steirisher Herbst (Paranoia TV) Graz
 2019 – Weissenhof City, Statdsgallerie Stuttgar
 2018 – FRONT International, Cleveland, OH, Screening at Centere Pompidou, Paris
 2017 – Documenta 14
 2016 – Collection on Display: Momentary Monuments, Migros Museum für Gegenwartskunst, Zurich, 
 2015 – Europa, Die Zukunft der Geschichte, Kunsthaus Zürich
 2014 – The Jewish Museum, New York, Kunstraum Innsbruck, Forum expanded – 66th Berlinale, Berlin
 2013 – Kunsthalle St. Gallen, Turku Art Museum, FIN, Screening at 2013 – ICA, London
 2012 – Stowaways Series, New Museum, New York,  Wattis Institute for Contemporary Arts, San Francisco, USA,
 2011 – ILLUMInazioni, 54. Biennale di Venezia, Untitled, 12. Istanbul Biennial

Publications
Chanting Down Babylon, 2009 Chanting Down Babylon | Anagram Books  Contributors: Eva Birkenstock, Hannes Loichinger

Historical Records, 2018 Snoeck Contributor: Marcus Gammel

An Elaborate Gesture of Pastness Current | Blood Mountain Projects  Contributors: Sa’ed Atshan, Noit Banai, Sabeth Buchmann, Burcu Dogramaci

I.E, edcat – i.e. Edition No. 43

Awards and residencies 
 2020 – Radio Lab CTM
 2019 – Residency at Blood Mountain Projects Vienna,  Fellowship at the Vienna Wiesenthal Institute for Holocaust Studies. Vienna, AT
 2012 – Hans Purmann Prize 
 2009 – Ars Viva Award
 2008 – Villa Romana Prize,  Florence, IT

External links
Artist website: Dani Gal
Gallery Kadel-Willborn: Kadel Willborn
Historical Records: Historical Records – by Dani Gal
Taking Measures – Usage of formats in film and video art: Taking Measures
Three Works For Piano: Dani Gal: Three Works for Piano - Announcements - e-flux
Paranoia T.V: Dani Gal im Gespräch mit David Riff - steirischer herbst
Blood Mountain Projects: 2019 | Vienna: Dani Gal | Blood Mountain Projects
Arsenal Berlin: Arsenal – Institut für Film und Videokunst e.V.
CTM Festival: Vague Dilation
Staatgalerie Stuttgart: Dani Gal, Michaela Melián, Martin Schmidl, Boris Sieverts: Weissenhof City - Announcements - e-flux
Schirn Hunsthalle: History as a fetish
The Wire: Dani Gal - The Wire
Art Forum: Adam Jasper on Dani Gal
Vienna Wiesenthal Institute: Dani Gal
Forward: Nazi Hunter Meets Nazi Architect
Kunst Halle Sankt Gallen Kunst Halle Sankt Gallen | Dani Gal
Berlinische Galerie: Review of Dani Gal’s ‘Hegemon’
Crew United: Dani Gal
IMDB: - IMDb
Kunst Forum: Gal, Dani

German people of Jewish descent
People from Jerusalem
Living people
Jewish artists
1975 births